Sayar (literally "he/she/it counts") is a Turkish surname and may refer to:
 Homa Sayar (born 1947), Iranian poet and writer
 Leyla Sayar (1939–2016), Turkish actress, author, ballerina, beauty queen and singer
 Mustafa Sayar (born 1989), Turkish cyclist
 Zeki Sayar (1905–2000), Turkish architect, journalist and the publisher
Turkish-language surnames